Sofya Kovalevskaya is a 1985 biographical television miniseries, directed by Ayan Shakhmaliyeva and starring Elena Safonova.

Synopsis
Epic film in three episodes, based on a true story of mathematician scientist Sofia Kovalevskaya. She was a Russian pioneer for women in Tzarist Russia. She was the first woman in the country to become a Member of the Russian Academy of Sciences. It seemed that the whole world was against her accomplishing this feat. In spite of all the obstacles she later got a Ph.D. in mathematics. However, as no Russian University would accept a woman, she had to emigrate to Western Europe for continuation of her career and studies. She had a daughter and family life. Sofya Kovalevskaya was eventually recognized in Russia. Leading scientists, like Academician Ivan Sechenov, took part in her education and career.

Production
Film was produced by Gosteleradio state production company of the Soviet Union with the production crew of Ekran Studios, Moscow.  Filming dates were in 1984 and 1985.  Post-production was completed by Ekran studios, and at postproduction facilities of Lenfilm studios in St. Petersburg in the spring of 1985.

Filming locations
Most scenes were filmed in St. Peterburg, Russia, where Sofia Kovalevskaya started her career in science. Some scenes of Western European cities were filmed in Baltic states. Scenes of Sofia Kovalevskaya as a student were filmed at St. Petersburg University.

Main cast
Elena Safonova as Sofya Kovalevskaya
Aristarkh Livanov
Natalya Sayko
Algimantas Masyulis
Lembit Ulfsak
Aleksandr Filippenko as Dostoyevsky
Yelena Arzhanik
Yelena Solovey
Yury Solomin
Petr Shelokhonov as Academician Ivan Sechenov
Vladimir Letenkov
Stanislav Landgraf
Vida-Vaiva Maynelite
Yelena Arzhanik
Nikolai Kryukov

Comments and connections
 This was the first leading role for actress Elena Safonova before she became an international film star.
 Premiered on the National TV of the Soviet Union in April 1985.

See also
 A Hill on the Dark Side of the Moon — a Swedish drama film about the life of Sofia Kovalevskaya

External links

1985 films
Biographical films about mathematicians
1980s Russian-language films
1980s biographical drama films
Soviet biographical drama films
Russian biographical drama films
Films set in the 19th century
Soviet television miniseries
1980s Soviet television series
1980s television miniseries
1985 drama films